This is a list of the National Register of Historic Places listings in Terrell County, Texas.

This is intended to be a complete list of properties and districts listed on the National Register of Historic Places in Terrell County, Texas. There are four properties listed on the National Register in the county.

Current listings 

|}

See also
National Register of Historic Places listings in Texas
Recorded Texas Historic Landmarks in Terrell County

References

External links

Terrell County, Texas
Terrell County
Buildings and structures in Terrell County, Texas